John Halliday may refer to:

 John Halliday (actor) (1880–1947), American actor
 John Halliday (ophthalmologist) (1871–1946), Australian doctor
 John Halliday (footballer) (born 1880), English professional footballer
 John Halliday (died 1805) (c. 1737–1805), British politician who sat in the House of Commons from 1775 to 1784
 John Halliday (died 1754) (c. 1709–1754), British politician who sat in the House of Commons in 1754
 John Halliday (cricketer) (1915–1945), English cricketer
 John Halliday (civil servant), Deputy Under Secretary of State at the UK Home Office (1991–2001)

See also
 Jon Halliday, British historian
 Johnny Hallyday (1943–2017), stage name of French singer and actor Jean-Philippe Smet